Alistair Sylvester (born October 29, 1994) is a Canadian pair skater. He competed at two World Junior Championships with Hayleigh Bell.

Career 
Sylvester and Hayleigh Bell teamed up around 2009 and were coached by Lee Barkell at the Allandale Recreation Centre in Barrie, Ontario. After winning the novice title at the 2012 Canadian Championships, the pair was named in Canada's team to the 2012 World Junior Championships in Minsk, Belarus. They placed 12th in the short program, 9th in the free skate, and 12th overall.

The following season, Bell/Sylvester received their first ISU Junior Grand Prix assignments; they placed 7th in Austria and 6th in Croatia. Having won the junior title at the 2013 Canadian Championships, they were sent to Milan, Italy to compete at the 2013 World Junior Championships. They finished 11th after placing 14th in the short and 10th in the free.

Programs 
(with Bell)

Competitive highlights 
(with Bell)

References

External links 

 

Canadian male pair skaters
1994 births
Living people
Sportspeople from Modesto, California